Aldeburgh Lifeboat Station is an RNLI station located in the town of Aldeburgh in the English county of Suffolk. the lifeboat station evolved from the Suffolk Shipwreck Association station in 1851 which was originally in Sizewell and there has been a lifeboat here since that date. The present station has two boats on station. These are the  lifeboat  and the  Inshore lifeboat . The station covers the coast between Harwich station to the south, and Southwold station to the North.

New boathouse
The current lifeboat station was built in 1994 to replace a smaller older one on the same site. The new station gave cover for the first time to the boat and Talus MB-H tractor. Incorporated into the design there is a public viewing platform. The station has showers and toilet facilities for the crew and a heated store for their foul weather suits. There are also further equipment storage rooms. This new boathouse was built using part of the bequest of Mrs Eugenie Boucher who had died in 1992.

Fleet
Aldeburgh Lifeboat Station currently operates two lifeboats. The All weather Lifeboat is a  lifeboat and is called the Freddie Cooper (ON 1193) and has been on station since November 1993. The lifeboat is 38 feet long and is self-righting. She is powered by two 285 hp turbo charged Caterpillar 3208T diesel engines and she has a range of 140 nautical miles. These two engines push the boat through the water to a top speed of 16 knots. Fully laden she weighs 13 tons and she is operated by a volunteer crew of six. The Lifeboat has a capacity to rescue 43 survivors (self-righting up to 21). She was purchased using a bequest to the RNLI from the late Mrs Winifred Cooper in memory of her husband Freddie.

The station should have received the new boat in 2021, however this is now under review again. 

The inshore lifeboat Christine has been on service at Aldeburgh since April 2007. This boat was funded by the bequest of Florence Winifred Kemp in memory of her daughter. The Christine normally has a crew of three or 4 and is powered by a 50 hp outboard engine. She is capable of a top speed of 25 knots. She has the capability to be beached easily with an easy refloat and is ideal for rescues close to shore and on the sandbanks which are along the coast at Aldeburgh.

No. 1 Station

No. 2 Station

Inshore lifeboats

Gallery

References

External links

Aldeburgh lifeboat official website

Suffolk Coastal
Lifeboat stations in Suffolk
Buildings and structures in Suffolk
Aldeburgh